The county colours of an Irish county are the colours of the kit worn by that county's representative team in the inter-county competitions of the Gaelic Athletic Association (GAA), the most important of which are the All-Ireland Senior Football Championship and the All-Ireland Senior Hurling Championship.  Fans attending matches often wear replica jerseys, and wave flags and banners in the county colours.  In the build-up to a major match, flags and bunting are flown or hung from cars, buildings, telegraph poles, and other fixtures across the county, especially in those regions where GAA support is strong.

Where a county's jersey is multi-coloured, these are the county colours.  Where the jersey is a single colour, the colour of the shorts is also included.  Shorts were always white until Down wore black shorts in the 1968 football final against Kerry, for better contrast in the black-and-white RTÉ telecast. Despite colour telecasts' 1971 arrival, other counties switched from white shorts, such as Dublin's now familiar navy blue.

In the early years of the All-Ireland championships, each county was formally represented by the club which won its county championship;  players from other clubs within the county were soon added to reinforce the squad, and gradually from 1900 county committees took over the selection of the team. At that date most inter-county teams still wore the kit of the champion club, but by 1910 some counties had adopted a standard strip. The 1913 GAA Congress passed a motion proposed by P. D. Mehigan and seconded by Harry Boland, "That a distinctive county colour be compulsory for inter-county, inter-provincial and All-Ireland contests, such colours to be approved of by the Provincial Councils concerned and registered with Central Council."

Flags and arms

In the latter half of the 20th century, the county councils of most counties designed coats of arms for registration with the Chief Herald of Ireland. Before then, the arms of the county town often served as arms for the county. The council arms often include the county colours established by the GAA team; examples include Clare and Laois.

There are no official county flags; flags with the GAA county colours serve as de facto county flags.  There are no standardised formats for these, except Kildare whose flag, like their kit, is all-white. Typically, flags are formed as vertical bicolours or tricolours, with the major colour nearest the hoist. Horizontal stripes are also found. This is common in County Offaly, where vertical county colours might be mistaken for the flag of Ireland; however other Offaly fans deliberately exploit this double significance. Flags with checkerboard, repeating stripes, and other patterns are also found.  Flags have been commercially produced which add the county arms to the colours, sometimes augmented with the county name in English or Irish. Such flags have been flown by the government of Ireland in the Upper Yard at Dublin Castle. County jerseys formerly often included the county crest, but since the 1980s county boards have developed their own logos; most were originally based on the official county arms, but some have since been replaced with unrelated designs. Flags with these logos added to the county colours are sold by or under licence from the county board.

Fans may also wave other flags of the appropriate colours.  For example, among the red-and-white flags used by individual Cork supporters have been the flag of Canada and the ensign of the Imperial Japanese Navy.  Blue-and-gold flags used by Tipperary supporters have included the national flags of Sweden and of Ukraine; Mayo fans have flown the green and red of Italy, Portugal and Bangladesh. Kerry supporters may wave the flag of Brazil both for its matching colours and to compare Kerry's continual success in Gaelic football to the Brazil national team's in soccer.
 
County nicknames interact with county colours. Wexford's colours reflect the pre-existing nickname "the Yellowbellies", while Kildare's give rise to its nickname "the Lilywhites".  As Cork is nicknamed the "Rebel County", its fans have also flown the Confederate battle flag; the county board banned this in 2020 in response to the George Floyd protests.

List

Provinces
The GAA Interprovincial Championship had a high profile in the mid 20th century. The provincial teams' colours are seldom used as flags in the manner of county colours; instead the pre-existing provincial arms are used as banners.

Outside Ireland
There are boards for areas of the Irish diaspora treated as counties within the GAA system. Those in Great Britain come under the British Provincial Board.

See also
 List of Irish counties' coats of arms. These are the coats of arms of the county councils; the GAA counties have separate crests, often based on the county council's.

References

Sources

Citations

Flags of Ireland
Gaelic games by county
County colours
County colours
Lists related to counties of Ireland
Color in culture